Yoncalı (literally "with clovers" in Turkish) may refer to:

 Yoncalı, Bayat
 Yoncalı, Bayburt, a village in the district of Bayburt, Bayburt Province, Turkey
 Yoncalı, Çerkeş
 Yoncalı, Ergani
 Yoncalı, Şavşat, a village in the district of Şavşat, Artvin Province, Turkey
 Yoncalı Dam, Turkey